Han Seung-soo (born 28 December 1936) is a South Korean politician and diplomat. He served as Prime Minister of the Republic of Korea from 29 February 2008 to 28 September 2009. He was the United Nations Secretary-General Ban Ki-moon's Special Envoy on Climate Change (2007–08) and for Disaster Risk Reduction and Water (2013–18), Special Advisor to the UN/World Bank High-Level Panel on Water (2016–18), Member of the UN Secretary-General's Advisory Board on Water and Sanitation Agency (UNSGAB, 2007–15), Member of the UN Secretary-General's High-Level Panel for Global Sustainability (GSP, 2010–12), Founding Chair of Global Green Growth Institute (GGGI, 2010–12), Temasek International Panel Member (2004–18) and Independent Non-Executive Director of Standard Chartered plc (2010-2019).

He was the President of the 56th Session of the General Assembly of the United Nations (2001–02), South Korea's Minister of Foreign Affairs (2001–02), Deputy Prime Minister and Minister of Finance (1996–97), Chief of Staff to the President Kim Young-sam (1994–95), South Korean Ambassador to the United States (1993–94) and Minister of Trade and Industry (1988–90). He was a three-term Member of National Assembly of the Republic of Korea (1988-1992, 1996-2004) directly elected by the people of his hometown, Chuncheon city, Gangwon-do Province.

Education 
Han was educated at Yonsei University (BA, 1960), Seoul National University (MPA, 1963), and University of York, England (Ph.D., 1968 /D.Univ., 1997). Prior to his entry into politics in 1988, he had a distinguished academic career as Professor of Economics at Seoul National University (1970–88), taught economics and/or did research at the Universities of York (1965–68), Cambridge (Emmanuel College, 1968–70), Harvard (1985–86), Tokyo (1986–87), and GRIPS (2004–06). He has honorary degrees from the Universities of York, Gangwon National, Yonsei, KAIST and Kuala Lumpur.

Political and diplomatic career
Han is currently, among others, Chair of High-Level Experts and Leaders Panel on Water and Disasters (HELP, 2007-), Host of the Biennial UN Special Thematic Session on Water and Disasters (2013-), Chair of the Water Advisory Group of Asia Development Bank (2014-), Vice President of Club de Madrid, Member of the WMO Water and Climate Leaders Panel, and Maureen and Mike Mansfield Foundation International Advisory Board Member, Vice-Chair of Zayed Sustainability Prize Jury, Co-Chair of International Finance Forum (China), Chair of the Jury for IFF Global Green Finance Award, Distinguished Professor at Zhejiang University International Business School, Chief International Advisor of International Monetary Institute (IMI) of Renmin University of China, Senior Advisor to Research Institute of ASEAN Economy (Shaoxing, China), and Founder of GG56 Ltd., a big data and blockchain startup. He was also Chairman of the 2014 PyeongChang Winter Olympic Games bid Committee.

His major international achievements include being one of the initiators of the APEC in 1989 as Minister of Trade and Industry, Korea's accession to the OECD in 1996 when he was the chief minister in charge of negotiations as Deputy Prime Minister and Minister of Finance, the global crisis management in the aftermath of 9/11 as President of the 56th Session of the United Nations General Assembly (the day to be elected was 11 September 2001) when he was Foreign Minister, and the passage of the unanimous resolution of the OECD Ministerial Council Meeting when he was Prime Minister of the Republic of Korea.

Publications 
Han has many publications in both Korean and English, the most recent ones being Here for Global Good: Collected Speeches of Han Seung-soo (YBM, Seoul, 2015) which was translated into Chinese and published by Tsinghua University Press in 2016, Beyond the Shadow of 9/11; A Year at the United Nations General Assembly (SAIS, Washington DC, 2007).

See also
Politics of South Korea

References

External links
Appearances on C-SPAN
Han Seung-soo's address to the 56th session of the United Nations General Assembly,  as President of the Assembly, November 10, 2001 (video)
Prime Minister Han Seung-soo's address to the 63rd session of the United Nations General Assembly, as representative of the Republic of Korea, 25 September 2008

1936 births
Living people
Academic staff of Seoul National University
Permanent Representatives of South Korea to the United Nations
South Korean Roman Catholics
Presidents of the United Nations General Assembly
Yonsei University alumni
Honorary Knights Commander of the Order of the British Empire
Liberty Korea Party politicians
Ambassadors of South Korea to the United States
Deputy Prime Ministers of South Korea
Finance ministers of South Korea
Foreign ministers of South Korea
Alumni of the University of York
Cheongju Han clan
Members of the National Assembly (South Korea)
Seoul National University alumni
Special Envoys of the Secretary-General of the United Nations
Chiefs of Staff to the President of South Korea